Girls at Arms 2 is a 1976 Danish comedy film directed by Finn Henriksen and starring Berrit Kvorning. It is a sequel to the 1975 film Girls at Arms.

Cast
 Berrit Kvorning as Premierløjtnant Merete Clausen
 Klaus Pagh as Hermann Clausen
 Dirch Passer as Vasby
 Karl Stegger as Major Basse
 Helle Merete Sørensen as Vibsen
 Ulla Jessen as Magda
 Magi Stocking as Børgesen
 Marianne Tønsberg as Irmgard Martinsen
 Birger Jensen as Frits
 Søren Strømberg as Otto
 Lille Palle as Orgeltramper
 Finn Nielsen as Oversergent Brysk
 Lotte Tarp as Journalisten Kirsten
 Lise Schrøder as Journalist
 Olaf Ussing as Forsvarsministeren

External links
 

1976 films
1976 comedy films
Danish comedy films
1970s Danish-language films
Danish sequel films
Films directed by Finn Henriksen